Sports form a part of the culture of Lesotho. Football is the most popular sport in the country.

History 
Lesotho first participated at the Olympic Games in 1972.

By sport

Cricket 
The Lesotho national cricket team is an associate member of the ICC.

Football 

Football is the most popular sport in the country. The national team, governed by the Lesotho Football Association represents Lesotho in various competitions, however, it has never qualified for the FIFA World Cup. The Lesotho Premier League is the top league of the country.

Rugby Union

References